Albin Ebondo (born 23 February 1984 in Marseille), is a Congolese-French football defender who last played for Saint-Étienne.

On 18 June 2007, Ebondo signed an extension to his extant 2008 contract making him stay with the club until 2010.

For the first time in 2007, he took part in the France national team pre-selection.

In 2018, he followed all the summer preparation with the CFA (reserve) team of AS Saint Etienne (France), trained by Laurent Battles and he also played a match during this preparation. He is looking for a new club

References

1984 births
Living people
Republic of the Congo footballers
French footballers
Footballers from Marseille
France under-21 international footballers
French sportspeople of Republic of the Congo descent
Olympique de Marseille players
Toulouse FC players
AS Saint-Étienne players
Ligue 1 players
France youth international footballers
Association football defenders
Black French sportspeople